W. Edward Rowen (born October 22, 1857 – February 22, 1892), was a Major League Baseball player who played catcher from -. He would play for the Boston Red Caps and Philadelphia Athletics.

External links

 Ed Rowen at SABR (Baseball BioProject)

1857 births
1922 deaths
Sportspeople from Bridgeport, Connecticut
Major League Baseball catchers
Philadelphia Athletics (AA) players
Boston Red Caps players
Baseball players from Connecticut
19th-century baseball players
Fall River Casscade players
Manchester (minor league baseball) players
San Francisco Bay City players
San Francisco Californias players
Oakland (minor league baseball) players